Ruža Vojsk (born 31 March 1930), also known as Rose Voisk, is a Slovenian former gymnast. She represented Yugoslavia at the 1948 Summer Olympics in London, finishing seventh with the team and 48th all-around. Following the Olympics, she moved to Germany and then Paris before settling in New York City in 1968. Since 1976, she has attended 11 editions of the Summer and Winter Olympic Games.

References

External links
Ruža Vojsk -  Sports-Reference.com

1930 births
Living people
Olympic gymnasts of Yugoslavia
Gymnasts at the 1948 Summer Olympics
Sportspeople from Maribor
Slovenian female artistic gymnasts